Cape Vincent Breakwater Light was a lighthouse on the breakwater protecting the harbor in the town of Cape Vincent, New York.

It has been moved to the Town Highway Department on New York State Route 12E.

It should not be confused with the nearby Tibbetts Point Light, an active lighthouse also in Cape Vincent.

References

External links
 
 Lighthouse Friends Site
 Coast Guard list of Lighthouses
 Coast Guard list of assets

Lighthouses completed in 1901
Lighthouses in Jefferson County, New York